Polyclès Langlois (29 September 1814 – 30 November 1872) was a French writer, draughtsman and painter.

Biography
Polyclès Langlois was born in Pont de l'Arche in Normandy on 29 September 1814.
He was the son of Eustache-Hyacinthe Langlois.
Polyclès and his older sister Espérance Langlois were both taught by their father and often assisted him with drawings and engravings.
He exhibited a view of Saint-Ouen and Old Street of old Rouen at the Salon de Paris of 1861.
He drew views of the monuments of Rouen and then worked at the Sèvres porcelain factory.
He died in Sèvres on 30 November 1872.

Selected works 

 Fontaine de la Croix de Pierre de Rouen. Eau-forte;
 Samuël Bochart, né à Rouen, 1835;
 Figures dehors un château dans un paysage vert, huile sur toile, 26×21 cm;
 Château d'Hautot à M. le baron Lézurier de La Martel, Hautot-sur-Seine, dessin au crayon noir;
 Vielle tour normande, aquarelle sur papier, 18×13 cm, 1842;
 Rouen, le pont suspendu, aquarelle sur papier, 28×43 cm;
 Aux portes de la ville, gouache on paper, 1850;
 Église de Caudebec (pays de Caux), dessin, 1845;
 La Grosse Horloge;
 Saint-Amand;
 Porche de l’église de Louviers;
 Tour de l’horloge;
 Quatre vues de Rouen et de Basse-Normandie, aquarelles;
 Souvenir de Rouen, dessin au crayon noir;
 Maison de la rue Impériale à Rouen, dessin à la mine de plomb;
 Marché de la Basse-Vieille-Tour, à Rouen, dessin à la mine de plomb
 Vue de l’église Saint-Ouen, à Rouen, dessin au crayon noir;
 Composition, dessin an crayon noir;
 Maisons de Rouen, dessin à la mine de plomb.
 L'Abbatiale Saint-Ouen de Rouen vue depuis les ponts du Robec 
 Rouen, vue du quai de Paris, la cathédrale à l'arrière-plan, 1838

Gallery

References

Sources

 
 

19th-century French painters
French male painters
1814 births
1872 deaths
French draughtsmen
19th-century French male artists